Subay (Bashkir and ) is a rural locality (a village) in Sharipovsky Selsoviet, Kushnarenkovsky District, Bashkortostan, Russia. The population was 44 as of 2010. There are 2 streets.

Geography 
Subay is located 19 km southeast of Kushnarenkovo (the district's administrative centre) by road. Nizhneakbashevo is the nearest rural locality.

References 

Rural localities in Kushnarenkovsky District